David Piper may refer to
 Sir David Piper (curator) (1918–1990), British curator and author
 David Piper (racing driver) (born 1930), British Formula One driver